Akimi (written: 陽生 or 秋生) is a unisex Japanese given name. Notable people with the name include:

, Japanese footballer
, Japanese manga artist
, Japanese professional footballer

Japanese unisex given names